Sérgio Romeu Marakis (born 11 November 1991) is a Portuguese professional footballer who plays as a defensive midfielder for C.D. Nacional.

He achieved 130 appearances and three goals in the two professional divisions of Portuguese football, where he represented Marítimo, Portimonense, União, Nacional and Cova da Piedade. He also had brief spells in Cyprus, Romania and Austria.

Club career
Born in Johannesburg, South Africa, Marakis was raised in Portugal, where he played as a youth mainly for C.S. Marítimo, and also briefly for Sporting CP. After playing in the former's reserves in the third division, he was called up to the first team at the end of the 2010–11 season, making his debut as a 60th-minute substitute for Rafael Miranda in a 0–2 home loss against champions FC Porto on the last day.

Marakis scored his first professional goal on 24 February 2013 in the reserves' 2–1 away defeat to Portimonense S.C. in the Segunda Liga, and got off the mark for the first team on 19 April the following year, in a 3–1 win over Académica de Coimbra at the Estádio dos Barreiros. For the 2014–15 campaign he was loaned to Portimonense, where he was ruled out by a knee injury from October to March.

After an unsuccessful 18 months at Ermis Aradippou FC in the Cypriot First Division, Marakis returned to Madeira with second-tier C.F. União in January 2017. Six months later, he became club captain. In January 2018, he terminated his contract due to delayed wages and signed an 18-month deal with a third side from the island, C.D. Nacional.

In July 2019, after winning the second division and then suffering relegation, Marakis moved on to C.D. Cova da Piedade. He subsequently went back abroad, with FC Argeș Pitești of the Romanian Liga I and SV Horn of the 2. Liga (Austria).

References

External links

1991 births
Living people
White South African people
Portuguese people of Greek descent
South African people of Greek descent
South African people of Portuguese descent
Citizens of Portugal through descent
Portuguese footballers
South African soccer players
Soccer players from Johannesburg
Association football midfielders
Primeira Liga players
Liga Portugal 2 players
Segunda Divisão players
C.S. Marítimo players
Portimonense S.C. players
C.F. União players
C.D. Nacional players
C.D. Cova da Piedade players
Cypriot First Division players
Ermis Aradippou FC players
Liga I players
FC Argeș Pitești players
2. Liga (Austria) players
SV Horn players
Portugal youth international footballers
Portuguese expatriate footballers
Expatriate footballers in Cyprus
Expatriate footballers in Romania
Expatriate footballers in Austria
Portuguese expatriate sportspeople in Cyprus
Portuguese expatriate sportspeople in Romania
Portuguese expatriate sportspeople in Austria